The 2021 UEFA European Under-19 Championship qualifying competition was a men's under-19 football competition that would have determined the seven teams joining the automatically qualified hosts Romania in the 2021 UEFA European Under-19 Championship final tournament. Players born on or after 1 January 2002 were eligible to participate.

Apart from Romania, 53 of the remaining 54 UEFA member national teams entered the qualifying competition, where the original format consisted of two rounds: Qualifying round, which would have taken place in autumn 2020, and Elite round, which would also have take place in spring 2021. However, due to the COVID-19 pandemic in Europe, UEFA announced on 13 August 2020 that after consultation with the 55 member associations, the qualifying round was delayed to March 2021, and the elite round was abolished and replaced by play-offs, with the 13 qualifying round group winners joining the top seed by coefficient ranking, Portugal (which originally received a bye to the elite round), in the play-offs in May 2021 to determine the teams qualifying for the final tournament.

On 23 February 2021, UEFA announced that, due to the COVID-19 pandemic in Europe and its effect on staging competitions, the tournament was cancelled.

Format
The qualifying competition originally consisted of the following two rounds:
Qualifying round: Apart from Portugal, which receive a bye to the elite round as the teams with the highest seeding coefficient, the remaining 52 teams were drawn into 13 groups of four teams. Each group was to be played in single round-robin format at one of the teams selected as hosts after the draw. The 13 group winners, the 13 runners-up, and the third-placed team with the best record against the first and second-placed teams in their group were to advance to the elite round.
Elite round: The 28 teams were to be drawn into seven groups of four teams. Each group was to be played in single round-robin format at one of the teams selected as hosts after the draw. The seven group winners were to qualify for the final tournament.

After the format change, the qualifying competition would have consisted of the following two rounds:
Qualifying round: The draw remained the same as before. The 13 group winners and Portugal, which originally received a bye to the elite round, would have advanced to the play-offs.
Play-offs: The 14 teams were to be drawn into seven ties. The seven winners would have qualified for the final tournament.

Qualifying round

Draw
The draw for the qualifying round was held on 3 December 2019, 10:00 CET (UTC+1), at the UEFA headquarters in Nyon, Switzerland.

The teams were seeded according to their coefficient ranking, calculated based on the following:
2016 UEFA European Under-19 Championship final tournament and qualifying competition (qualifying round and elite round)
2017 UEFA European Under-19 Championship final tournament and qualifying competition (qualifying round and elite round)
2018 UEFA European Under-19 Championship final tournament and qualifying competition (qualifying round and elite round)
2019 UEFA European Under-19 Championship final tournament and qualifying competition (qualifying round and elite round)

Each group contained one team from Pot A, one team from Pot B, one team from Pot C, and one team from Pot D. Based on the decisions taken by the UEFA Emergency Panel, the following pairs of teams could not be drawn in the same group: Spain and Gibraltar, Ukraine and Russia, Serbia and Kosovo, Russia and Kosovo, Bosnia and Herzegovina and Kosovo.

Notes
Teams marked in bold have qualified for the final tournament.

Groups
The qualifying round was originally scheduled to be played by 17 November 2020. However, due to the COVID-19 pandemic in Europe, UEFA announced on 13 August 2020 that after consultation with the 55 member associations, the qualifying round was delayed to March 2021,<ref name="UEFA20200813"/ before its cancellation earlier in February.

Times up to 27 March 2021 are CET (UTC+1), thereafter times are CEST (UTC+2), as listed by UEFA (local times, if different, are in parentheses).

Group 1
Originally scheduled to be played between 11–17 November 2020.

Group 2
Originally scheduled to be played between 10–16 November 2020.

Group 3
Originally scheduled to be played between 11–17 November 2020.

Group 4
Originally scheduled to be played between 11–17 November 2020.

Group 5
Originally scheduled to be played between 7–13 October 2020.

Group 6
Originally scheduled to be played between 11–17 November 2020.

Group 7
Originally scheduled to be played between 11–17 November 2020.

Group 8
Originally scheduled to be played between 7–13 October 2020.

Group 9
Originally scheduled to be played between 7–13 October 2020.

Group 10
Originally scheduled to be played between 11–17 November 2020.

Group 11
Originally scheduled to be played between 7–13 October 2020.

Group 12
Originally scheduled to be played between 10–16 November 2020.

Group 13
Originally scheduled to be played between 11–17 November 2020.

Elite round
The draw for the elite round would originally be held on 9 December 2020 at the UEFA headquarters in Nyon, Switzerland, and the matches were originally scheduled to be played in spring 2021. However, due to the COVID-19 pandemic in Europe, UEFA announced on 13 August 2020 that after consultation with the 55 member associations, the elite round was abolished and replaced by play-offs.<ref name="UEFA20200813"/

Play-offs
The 14 teams were to be drawn into seven ties. The seven winners would have qualified for the final tournament. The play-offs were scheduled to be played in May 2021.<ref name="UEFA20200813"/
Qualified teams

Group 1 winner
Group 2 winner
Group 3 winner
Group 4 winner
Group 5 winner
Group 6 winner
Group 7 winner
Group 8 winner
Group 9 winner
Group 10 winner
Group 11 winner
Group 12 winner
Group 13 winner

Times are CEST (UTC+2), as listed by UEFA (local times, if different, are in parentheses).

Qualified teams
The following eight teams were to qualify for the final tournament.

1 Bold indicates champions for that year. Italic indicates hosts for that year.

References

External links

Under-19 Matches: 2021 Qualifying, UEFA.com

Qualification
2021
2020 in youth association football
2021 in youth association football
March 2021 sports events in Europe
May 2021 sports events in Europe
Association football events cancelled due to the COVID-19 pandemic